SS Oliver Ellsworth was a Liberty ship built in the United States during World War II. She was named after Founding Father Oliver Ellsworth, an American lawyer, judge, politician, and diplomat. He was a framer of the United States Constitution, a United States senator from Connecticut, and the third Chief Justice of the United States.

Construction
Oliver Ellsworth was laid down on 31 March 1942, under a Maritime Commission (MARCOM) contract, MCE hull 42, by the Bethlehem-Fairfield Shipyard, Baltimore, Maryland; she was sponsored by Miss Frances T. Cwalina, an Honor Student at Benjamin Franklin Junior High School, Brooklyn, Maryland, and was launched on 22 June 1942.

History
She was allocated to A.H. Bull & Co., Inc., on 6 June 1942.

Sinking

Oliver Ellsworth was just three months old when she was assigned to Convoy PQ 18, one of the Arctic convoys delivering supplies to the Soviet Union. She carried  of ammunition and aircraft as deck cargo. She was commanded by her Master, Otto Ernest Buford.

One of the torpedoes struck the Soviet merchant ship  and ruptured her boiler. The other two torpedoes missed her, but one of them hit Oliver Ellsworth which had had to steer hard to port to avoid Stalingrad.

The torpedo struck Oliver Ellsworth on her starboard side between holds #4 and #5. After immediately securing the engines, the crew of eight officers, 34 crewmen, and 28 Armed guards quickly abandoned the stricken ship in four lifeboats, due to  fear of their cargo of ammunition exploding. Because Oliver Ellsworth continued her forward momentum, both starboard lifeboats were swamped and one of her port lifeboats struck a raft and sank. Within an hour the rescue ship Copeland and the A/S trawler , had picked up all the survivors; they were later landed at Archangel. After the rescue, St. Kenan scuttled Oliver Ellsworth by firing several shells into the drifting wreck. She sank stern first near  at 10:30. Out of a complement of 70, all had been rescued except for one Armed guard who drowned.

Further reading
18/index.htm Account of the sinking of the Oliver Ellsworth

References

Bibliography

 
 
 
 
 

 

Liberty ships
Ships sunk by German submarines in World War II
Ships built in Baltimore
1942 ships
World War II shipwrecks in the Arctic Ocean
Maritime incidents in September 1942
Ships named for Founding Fathers of the United States